Paulo Victor de Almeida Barbosa (born 13 April 2001), known as Paulo Victor, is a Brazilian footballer who plays as left back for Vasco da Gama, on loan from Internacional.

Club career
Born in Bocaiúva, Minas Gerais but raised in Piabetá, Magé, Rio de Janeiro, Paulo Victor was a Nova Iguaçu youth graduate. He made his first team debut on 19 February 2020, starting in a 2–2 Campeonato Carioca home draw against America-RJ.

In November 2020, Paulo Victor moved to Botafogo on loan, and was initially assigned to the under-20s. He began the 2021 campaign in the first team, and subsequently became a starter for the club before signing a permanent deal until 2024 on 21 May 2021.

On 25 June 2021, Paulo Victor signed a three-and-a-half-year deal with Internacional in the Série A. He made his top tier debut on 3 July, starting in a 1–1 away draw against Corinthians.

Career statistics

References

External links
Internacional profile 

2001 births
Living people
Sportspeople from Minas Gerais
Brazilian footballers
Association football defenders
Campeonato Brasileiro Série A players
Campeonato Brasileiro Série B players
Nova Iguaçu Futebol Clube players
Botafogo de Futebol e Regatas players
Sport Club Internacional players
CR Vasco da Gama players
People from Magé